"The British Grenadiers" is a traditional marching song of British, Australian and Canadian military units whose badge of identification features a grenade, the tune of which dates from the 17th century. It is the Regimental Quick March of the Royal Artillery (since 1716), Corps of Royal Engineers (since 1787), the Honourable Artillery Company (since 1716), Grenadier Guards 'The First (later 'Grenadier') Regiment of Foot Guards' (since 1763), and the Royal Regiment of Fusiliers (since 1763). It is also an authorised march of the Royal Australian Artillery, The Royal Gibraltar Regiment, The Royal Regiment of Canadian Artillery, The Royal Regiment of Canada, The Princess Louise Fusiliers, and The 5th Canadian Mounted Rifles. The standard orchestration for the military band was approved in 1762, when the Royal Artillery Band (initiated in 1557) became recognised officially, and for all other 'grenade' regiments in 1763, when the remaining unofficial bands gained official status.

History 
The exact origins of the tune are disputed but generally date to the early 17th century. It appears in John Playford's 1728 collection of dance tunes as "The New Bath", while Victorian musicologist William Chappell also suggested links to a 1622 work called "Sir Edward Nowell's Delight". The debate is best summarised by the composer Ernest Walker in 1907 who described the melody as "three centuries' evolution of an Elizabethan tune".

The melody was introduced into Britain as a military march during the 1689–1702 reign of William III and has similarities with one written for Prince John William of Friesland (1687–1711). Henry Grattan Flood suggested as another candidate the 1672 Dutch march "Wilhelmus van Nassouwe", which in turn was a reworking of a French version from 1568.

"The British Grenadiers" refers to grenadiers in general, not the Grenadier Guards Regiment, and all Fusilier units were entitled to use it. It allegedly commemorates an assault in August 1695 by 700 British grenadiers on the French-held fortress of Namur during the Nine Years War. A tune known as 'The Granadeer's March' was mentioned in a London publication in 1706, although it is not clear that it was the same melody known today. Francis Grose in his 1786 work Military Antiquities quoted two lines of the lyrics ('Come let us fill a bumper, and drink a health to those,/Who wear the caps and pouches, and eke the looped clothes') as part of a 'grenadier song' he already considered to be 'old'.

It was a popular tune in both Britain and North America throughout the 18th and 19th centuries and remains so. It is most commonly heard today in the annual Trooping the Colour ceremony when the Colour Escort marches into position on Horse Guards Parade.

Lyrics 

The following text may date back to the War of Spanish Succession (1702–1713), since it refers to the grenadiers throwing grenades and the men wearing "caps and pouches" (i.e. the tall grenadier caps, worn by these elite troops, and the heavy satchel in which grenades were carried) and "loupèd clothes"- coats with broad bands of 'lace' across the chest that distinguished early grenadiers.

Before the American Revolution, Joseph Warren wrote a parody song called "Free America" and has the same tune.

Historical terms 

There are a number of words in the song not commonly used or whose meaning is obscure;
 Fusee: shortened muskets carried by Grenadier officers, sometimes called fusils. This is accurately depicted in David Morier's painting of the Highland charge at the Battle of Culloden, the Government troops are grenadiers and their officer wields a fusil.
 Glacis: a smooth sloping embankment usually in front of the walls of a fort; designed to deflect cannonballs, it also gave defenders a clear field of fire, making it a dangerous place to stand upright and throw grenades;
 Bumper: any drinking container used in a toast, normally filled with beer or other alcohol;
 Loupèd: 'looped' pronounced "loup-ed" to scan; it refers to the lace button-holes or 'loops' on grenadier uniforms.
 Tow, row, row, row: mimics the rhythm and beat of the drums used to keep soldiers in step.

In popular culture 
Like "Rule, Britannia!", the song is frequently used in film and television to introduce a British setting or character, or indicate stereotypical Britishness.
Alistair Ramson in the Sherlock Holmes film The Scarlet Claw sings this song when he is disguised as the character Postman Potts, delivering mail to Emile Journet.
The character Mr. Bucket in the Dickens novel Bleak House plays this song by fife in Chapter 49.
The tune is heard by the protagonist rifleman Dodd of the British Army in C. S. Forester's Death to the French when he rejoins his unit.
In the fourth series of Blackadder (Blackadder Goes Forth), theme composer Howard Goodall incorporated the first two bars of the march into the series theme song, with the third and fourth being added into the full version of the theme.
During the episode "Merry Christmas Mr. Bean", Mr. Bean hums the song whilst playing with Queen's Guard figurines. This itself could be a reference to Blackadders usage of it; Rowan Atkinson played both Blackadder and Mr Bean.
The tune occurs as the main theme of the finale of the fourth piano concerto of Ignaz Moscheles.
The "Gentleman Soldier", another traditional British song, uses the same tune.
"The British Grenadiers" is played in the films Listen to Britain, Revolution (1985), Horatio Hornblower, The Miracle (1959), Pirates of the Caribbean: The Curse of the Black Pearl, Empire of the Sun, Barry Lyndon, Under Capricorn, The Italian Job, The Patriot (2000), 55 Days at Peking, Pride & Prejudice (2005), The Four Feathers, Diamonds Are Forever, Breaker Morant, Young Winston, and Patton, and the television series Sharpe's Company. It can also be heard at the end of The Life and Death of Colonel Blimp.
The tune – with a different trio section – was used as the Regimental March of the Hanoverian Grenadier Guards in Hannover, Germany, until 1866. It had also been taken into the Royal Prussian Army March Collection's Second Volume (Quick marches) earlier, as Army March AM II, 52, during 1821.
"Some people like a motorbike,/Some say, 'A tram for me',/Or for any bonnie lorry they'd lay them doon and dee" (alternatively, "Some talk of a Lagonda,/ Some like a smart MG/...") is the beginning of "A Transport of Delight" set to the same melody by Flanders and Swann.
A rather bawdy version exists about the grenadier suffering and spreading syphilis. This song is well known and popular as a drinking song amongst historical re-enactors.
The melody is used in a pro-labour song "The Eight Hour Day" which appears on the album American Industrial Ballads by Pete Seeger.
The tune was used as the startup theme for Associated-Rediffusion, when they made the first British commercial television broadcast in September 1955. "The British Grenadiers" was used with the film Blithe Spirit by Richard Addinsell for at least another year.
 The character of Daniel Hagman (played by actor and musician John Tams) in the TV movie Sharpe's Mission sings this song just prior to the climax of the film.
The melody is used as the basis for Hornet Squadron's song in Piece of Cake, with new lyrics.
"The British Grenadiers" is also the Regimental Quick March of the Fort Henry Guard. It is also frequently used by the Drill Squad of the Guard as a marching song.
The tune is used in the PC game Sid Meier's Pirates! to represent the English presence in the Caribbean.
For 20th-century Northern (US) Baptist and Disciples of Christ hymnals, the tune, called "Sheffield", or "Sheffield (English)" to distinguish it from other tunes named "Sheffield", is commonly set to the text "Hail to the Lord's Anointed" by James Montgomery.
It also appears on the BBC drama series Ashes to Ashes, in the last two episodes of the series.
 The Fall song "Gross Chapel-British Grenadiers" incorporates a section of the song.
In the AMC series Turn: Washington's Spies, Captain Simcoe of the British Army hums the tune during Episode 3, Season 1 ("Of Cabbages and Kings") to antagonize his American captors when he believes a Tory militia is on the way.
In the film Northwest Passage with Spencer Tracy and Robert Young, set during the French and Indian War, the tavern owner at the start of the film is singing the song.
Season 4, Episode 5 of The Crown ends with the tune playing while Prime Minister Margaret Thatcher waves at a victory parade following the Falklands War.
In Season 1, Episode 8 of Ghosts, the British soldiers march in and out to fife accompaniment of this song.

Controversial use

Christchurch mosque shootings 

Alongside "Remove Kebab" and Arthur Brown's "Fire", this song was played on Christchurch mosque shooter Brenton Tarrant's loudspeakers as he parked his car near Al Noor Mosque and walks outside before starting the massacre which killed 51 and injured 40.

See also 
Grenadier Guards Band

Notes

References

External links 
The Original 1750s Lyrics to The British Grenadiers Shows how the lyrics evolved from a soldier's song to something more palatable to the educated classes of British society. There was no "bumper", "looped" or "tow row row row" in the original version of the song.  The first words began: "Some boast of Alexander".
Lyrics and some explanation of unusual words
The Virtual Grammophone, Canadian Historical Sound Recordings, Marches, British Grenadiers (regimental march of the Canadian Grenadier Guards) ram (RealPlayer)
The official site of the Grenadier Guards Band.

British military marches
British patriotic songs
17th-century songs
Grenadier Guards
Songs of the American Revolutionary War
Royal Regiment of Fusiliers
Year of song unknown
Canadian military marches
Songs about soldiers
Songs about the military